Maryna Moroz (Ukrainian: Марина Мороз; born September 8, 1991) is a Ukrainian professional mixed martial artist, signed with the Ultimate Fighting Championship (UFC), where she competes in the Women's Flyweight division. Moroz is also a boxing coach for the Ukrainian Olympic women's boxing team.

Mixed martial arts career

Early career
Moroz started practicing boxing at a young age. She began training in mixed martial arts in 2013 as there was a lack of opportunity in professional women's boxing in Ukraine. She made her professional debut in 2013 and amassed a record of 5-0, before joining Xtreme Fighting Championships.

Xtreme Fighting Championships
After a 5–0 stint on the regional circuit, Moroz signed with Florida based promotion Xtreme Fighting Championships. Moroz faced Karine Silva in her debut at XFC International 7 on November 1, 2014. She won the fight via armbar submission in the first round.

Ultimate Fighting Championship
Moroz made her promotional debut in the Ultimate Fighting Championship (UFC) against Joanne Calderwood on April 11, 2015 at UFC Fight Night 64. Moroz won the fight via armbar submission in the first round. This win earned Moroz her first Performance of the Night bonus award.

Moroz next faced Valérie Létourneau on August 23, 2015 at UFC Fight Night 74. Moroz lost the back-and-forth fight via unanimous decision.

Moroz rebounded from her first career defeat with a decision win over Cristina Stanciu at UFC Fight Night: Rothwell vs. dos Santos on April 10, 2016.

Moroz defeated Danielle Taylor at UFC Fight Night: Rodríguez vs. Caceres via split decision on August 6, 2016.

On June 25, 2017, Moroz faced inaugural UFC women’s strawweight champion Carla Esparza at UFC Fight Night: Chiesa vs. Lee. She lost the fight via unanimous decision.

Moroz was expected to face Jamie Moyle on January 20, 2018 at UFC 220. However, Moyle pulled out of the fight during the week leading up to the event, citing an undisclosed injury, and the bout was cancelled.

Moroz faced former Invicta FC champion Angela Hill on February 24, 2018 at UFC on Fox: Emmett vs. Stephens. She lost the fight by unanimous decision.

Moroz was expected to face Ariane Lipski on November 17, 2018 at UFC Fight Night 140.  However, on October 29, 2018, it was reported that Moroz pulled out from the bout, due to an injury.

Moroz faced promotional newcomer Sabina Mazo in her flyweight debut on March 30, 2019 at UFC on ESPN 2. Moroz won the fight via unanimous decision.

Moroz was expected to face Poliana Botelho on August 17, 2019 at UFC 241. However, it was reported on August 1, 2019, that Moroz was forced to pull from the event, citing an injury.

Moroz faced Mayra Bueno Silva on March 14, 2020 at UFC Fight Night 170. Moroz won the fight via unanimous decision. This fight earned her the Fight of the Night award.

Moroz was scheduled to face Montana De La Rosa on September 5, 2020 at UFC Fight Night 176. However, Moroz was forced to withdraw from the event, due to visa issues, and she was replaced by Viviane Araújo.

Moroz was scheduled to face Taila Santos on December 5, 2020 at UFC on ESPN 19. However, on November 18, it was announced that Moroz had to pull out, and she was replaced by Montana De La Rosa.

Moroz was scheduled to face Manon Fiorot on June 5, 2021 at UFC Fight Night 189. However, Moroz was pulled from the event for undisclosed reasons, and she was replaced by Tabatha Ricci.

Moroz was scheduled to face Luana Carolina on October 16, 2021 at UFC Fight Night 195. However, at the end of September, Moroz pulled out of the bout for undisclosed reasons and was replaced by Sijara Eubanks.

Moroz faced Mariya Agapova on March 5, 2022 at UFC 272.  She won the fight via a submission in round two. This win earned her the Performance of the Night award.

Moroz was scheduled to face Sijara Eubanks on July 9, 2022, at UFC Fight Night 209. However, the pair was moved to UFC Fight Night 210 on September 17, 2022 for undisclosed reasons. In early September, the bout was scrapped again for undisclosed reasons as Moroz was rebooked for a new bout.

Moroz was scheduled to face Jennifer Maia on September 17, 2022, at UFC Fight Night 214.  However, the pair was moved to UFC Fight Night 215 on November 19, 2022, for undisclosed reasons. Moroz lost the fight via unanimous decision.

Championships and accomplishments

Mixed martial arts
Ultimate Fighting Championship
Fight of the Night (One time) 
Performance of the Night (Two times)

Mixed martial arts record

|-
|Loss
|align=center|11–4
|Jennifer Maia
|Decision (unanimous)
|UFC Fight Night: Nzechukwu vs. Cuțelaba
|
|align=center|3
|align=center|5:00
||Las Vegas, Nevada, United States
|
|-
|Win
|align=center|11–3
|Mariya Agapova
|Submission (arm-triangle choke)
|UFC 272
|
|align=center|2
|align=center|3:27
|Las Vegas, Nevada, United States
|
|-
|Win
|align=center|10–3
|Mayra Bueno Silva
|Decision (unanimous)
|UFC Fight Night: Lee vs. Oliveira 
|
|align=center|3
|align=center|5:00
|Brasília, Brazil
|
|-
|Win
|align=center|9–3
|Sabina Mazo
|Decision (unanimous)
|UFC on ESPN: Barboza vs. Gaethje 
|
|align=center|3
|align=center|5:00
|Philadelphia, Pennsylvania, United States
|
|-
|Loss
|align=center|8–3
|Angela Hill
|Decision (unanimous)
|UFC on Fox: Emmett vs. Stephens
|
|align=center|3
|align=center|5:00
|Orlando, Florida, United States
|
|-
|Loss
|align=center|8–2
|Carla Esparza
|Decision (unanimous)
|UFC Fight Night: Chiesa vs. Lee
|
|align=center|3
|align=center|5:00
|Oklahoma City, Oklahoma, United States
|
|-
|Win
|align=center|8–1
|Danielle Taylor
|Decision (split)
|UFC Fight Night: Rodríguez vs. Caceres 
|
|align=center|3
|align=center|5:00
|Salt Lake City, Utah, United States
|
|-
|Win
|align=center|7–1
|Cristina Stanciu
|Decision (unanimous)
|UFC Fight Night: Rothwell vs. dos Santos
|
|align=center|3
|align=center|5:00
|Zagreb, Croatia
|
|-
|Loss
|align=center|6–1
|Valérie Létourneau
|Decision (unanimous)
|UFC Fight Night: Holloway vs. Oliveira
|
|align=center|3
|align=center|5:00
|Saskatoon, Saskatchewan, Canada
|
|-
|Win
|align=center|6–0
|Joanne Calderwood
|Submission (armbar)
|UFC Fight Night: Gonzaga vs. Cro Cop 2
|
|align=center|1
|align=center|1:30
|Kraków, Poland
|
|-
|Win
|align=center|5–0
|Karine Silva
|Submission (armbar)
|XFC International 7
|
|align=center|1
|align=center|3:27
|São Paulo, Brazil
|
|-
|Win
|align=center|4–0
|Ilona Avdeeva
|TKO (doctor stoppage)
|IMAT: Moroz vs. Avdeeva
|
|align=center|1
|align=center|1:15
|Moscow, Russia
|
|-
|Win
|align=center|3–0
|Jin Tang
|Submission (straight armbar)
|Kunlun Fight 8 
|
|align=center|1
|align=center|3:50
|Leshan, China
|
|-
|Win
|align=center|2–0	
|Feier Huang
|Submission (armbar)
|Kunlun Fight 5 
|
|align=center|1
|align=center|2:52	
|Leshan, China
|
|-
|Win
|align=center|1–0
|Yana Kuzioma
|Submission (armbar)
|Oplot Challenge 89
|
|align=center|2
|align=center|1:12
|Kharkiv, Ukraine
|

References

External links
 
 
 

1991 births
Ukrainian female mixed martial artists
Strawweight mixed martial artists
Mixed martial artists utilizing boxing
Mixed martial artists utilizing kickboxing
Living people
Sportspeople from Dnipropetrovsk Oblast
Boxing trainers
Kunlun Fight MMA Fighters
Flyweight mixed martial artists
Ultimate Fighting Championship female fighters